The CONCACAF play-off of the 2024 Women's Olympic Football Tournament qualification competition will decide the second CONCACAF spot for the Olympic football tournament in France. The play-off will be contested over two legs by the teams finishing second and third in the 2022 CONCACAF W Championship, Canada and Jamaica, respectively. The matches will take place in September 2023, with Jamaica hosting the first leg and Canada hosting the second. The winner will also qualify for the 2024 CONCACAF W Gold Cup.

Qualified teams
CONCACAF was awarded two spots in the 2024 Women's Olympic Football Tournament by FIFA. The first spot was awarded to the winner of the 2022 CONCACAF W Championship. The teams finishing second and third in the W Championship will contest the play-off for the second qualification place.

Format
The tie will be played in a two-legged home-and-away format, with the runners-up of the W Championship, Canada, playing the second leg at home. The team that scores more goals on aggregate over the two legs will qualify for the 2024 Summer Olympics, as well as the 2024 CONCACAF W Gold Cup. The losers will instead enter qualification for the W Gold Cup. If the aggregate score is level, the away goals rule will be applied, i.e. the team that scores more goals away from home over the two legs will qualify. If away goals are also equal, then 30 minutes of extra time will be played, though the away goals rule will not be applied in extra time. If the score remains level after extra time, the winners will be decided by a penalty shoot-out.

Summary
The play-off matches will take place between 18 and 26 September 2023, as per the FIFA International Match Calendar.

|}

Matches

References

Play-off
2023–24 in CONCACAF football
September 2023 sports events in North America
Jamaica women's national football team
Canada women's national soccer team matches
2023 in Canadian soccer